Emilie Bosshard Haavi (born 16 June 1992) is a Norwegian professional footballer who plays as a left midfielder who plays for Italian Serie A club AS Roma and the Norway women's national team.

Haavi was according to Fjordabladet, elected Player of the Year in 2020 Toppserien.

Club career
She has played in the Toppserien, the top division in Norway, for Røa from 2008 to 2012 and for LSK Kvinner from 2013 to 2016.

On 31 October 2016, she signed with the Boston Breakers of the NWSL. In August 2017, Boston Breakers waived Haavi in a mutual agreements to allow her to return to Norway due to homesickness. On 15 August it was announced that Haavi was returning to her former club,  LSK Kvinner.

On 15 December 2021, Haavi joined AS Roma.

International career
She made her debut for the Norway women's national football team in 2010, and appeared at the 2011 World Cup in Germany, scoring a goal in the group stage against Equatorial Guinea on 29 June. She also played in the qualifying stages for the 2011 UEFA Women's Under-19 Championship, but wasn't called up to the finals due to her commitment with the senior side.
Veteran national coach Even Pellerud selected Haavi in Norway's squad for UEFA Women's Euro 2013 campaign in Sweden. In the final at Friends Arena, she was an unused substitute as Norway lost 1–0 to Germany. She was also selected for the 2015 FIFA Women's World Cup.

International goals

Career statistics

Honours
With Røa Haavi won the Norwegian Women's Cup three times; in 2008, 2009 and 2010 and Toppserien in 2009, 2010 and 2011.

References

External links
 
 

1992 births
Living people
Norwegian women's footballers
Norway women's international footballers
2011 FIFA Women's World Cup players
Toppserien players
National Women's Soccer League players
Røa IL players
LSK Kvinner FK players
Boston Breakers players
Sportspeople from Bærum
Women's association football forwards
2015 FIFA Women's World Cup players
Expatriate women's soccer players in the United States
2019 FIFA Women's World Cup players
A.S. Roma (women) players
Serie A (women's football) players
Expatriate women's footballers in Italy
Norwegian expatriate sportspeople in Italy
UEFA Women's Euro 2017 players